Two ships of the Royal Navy have borne the name HMS Tenacious:

  was an  launched in 1917 and sold in 1928.
  was a T-class destroyer launched in 1943.  She was converted into a Type 16 frigate between 1951 and 1952 and was scrapped in 1965.

Royal Navy ship names